('game of war') often simply called  or , sometimes referred to as  ('dance of war') or , is a combined martial art and dance that was developed in Cuba by African slaves. It has its roots in the Kongo-Angola culture and is still kept alive today in Cuba by folkloric groups.

Etymology
The word mani (or accented  in Spanish to indicate stress on the final syllable) is said to mean 'war', in an indeterminate African language, and is not a reference to 'peanuts', which the word  can also refer to in Cuban Spanish.

In English, some modern practitioners call it simply mani, with no accent.  The descriptive term mani stick-fighting may also be encountered.

History 
Cuban  is related to Brazilian  in its African roots, as both derive from the Kongo-Angola culture. As with other similar dance and martial artforms arising in the 16th century onward among African slaves in European colonies in the Americas,  developed initially as means for the slaves to disguise fighting practice as a form of dance, in their scarce free time from labor. Some of their masters would recognize it as fighting competition and gamble on the outcomes.  It is thought that sometimes slaves were made to fight to the death for their masters' sport.

The distinct Cuban  form had emerged clearly by the 19th century on Cuban sugar-cane plantations, by then staffed by free people of mixed Afro-Cuban ancestry.

Originally, Cuban women also danced , and this was outlawed in the 1930s, but was still performed.

Today,  is  very folkloric, and those who practice it do so mainly as a pastime or for socializing, because it encompasses so much: music, singing, sparring, friendship, etc.

Caricao has a version, and Puerto Rico has its own  called  which should not be confused with Cuba's .

Form, techniques, and music 

Bouts feature a pair of opponents who follow prescribed dancing and fighting patterns, in a circle.  In early colonial Cuba, maní involved a solo dancer who danced within a circle of opponents, who tried to strike blows as he executed various jumps and evasive steps. It later became a one-on-one form.

Although not as gymnastic as capoeira regional, it is much more similar to capoeira Angola, and to l'agya (a.k.a. damaye or mayolé) from Martinique and Guadeloupe.  The footwork is similar in theory to the Brazilian ginga, but has a more stomping motion.

The combat system of maní encompasses techniques such as low kicks, foot sweeps, punches, head-butts, elbow strikes, and strikes with the forearms, knees, and palms, as well as the cartwheel.  Each fight ends in a sweep, take down or grappling maneuver.

Maní may also use weapons such as a cane staff (used similarly to those of calinda-style stick-fighting in Trinidad and other Caribbean locales), as well as knives, including the machete and double machete.  The stick used is about the thickness of a sugar cane (whether made of that traditional material or not), and about 16 inches (40 cm) long. The original martial art form of juego de maní risked particular danger, because the dancer/fighter sometimes wore leather wrist covers, muñequeras, that were adorned with nails and other sorts of metal.

The rhythm of the dance/fight is based on the rhythm that is played by the musicians, and accompanying musicians are expected to synchronize drumming accents with movement accents in the performance. This form was popular in Matanzas and Las Villas provinces and featured circling, competitive male dancing, which influenced non-combative, social dances that were created in Cuba, such as rumba Columbia.

The music utilized in juego de maní is that of Palo Monte, or simply Palo, an Afro-Cuban religion.  One of the most popular maní songs is "Vamos a la guerra si maní" ('We go to war if [there is] maní').

Maniseros
Skilled practitioners are called .  A grandmaster of the art who still teaches in Cuba is Juan de Dios Ramos Morejón, the founder-director of Cuban folkloric dance company Raices Profundas ('Deep Roots').  De Dios grew up fighting in the streets of Cuba and he has been called a "living encyclopedia" of the art, when he chooses to teach it.  He has been an ambassador of Afro-Cuban music and martial arts for many years, having traveled to teach in places as diverse as Germany, Japan, the United States, and Mexico.  His Puerto Rican New Yorker protégé Miguel Quijano (a current mani teacher and instructional author) notes De Dios as also a santero, and a ceremonial singer "versed in Yoruba, Palo, Abakua, and Arara traditions, known throughout Cuba".

De Dios was in turn a student, with seven others, of the great manisero Argeliers Leon.  Quijano writes of the eight graduates of Leon that they "knew the art ... in its entirety", as both a dance form and a martial art, and were founding members of the Conjunto Folklorico Nacional (Cuba's 'National Folkloric Connection' dance organization), where they taught "a folkloric version", i.e. one oriented to dance performance.

It is through these folklorical groups that Palo and maní are kept alive. Although a few masters still exist in Cuba, not many truly understand the fighting aspects of the art over the folkloric dance version.  According to Quijano, who has studied under several of them, the only living master maniseros are Juan de Dios, Carlos Aldama, and Rogelio Martinez Fure (he also counts Cuban journalist Alberto Pedro, but as a retired practitioner).

References

External links

Combat sports
Cuban culture
Dance in Cuba
Dances of the Caribbean
Kongo culture
Latin American folk dances
Latin dances
Martial arts in Cuba
Religion in Cuba
Rumba
Theatrical combat
War dances
North American martial arts
Stick-fighting

de:Afrokubanische Rumba